Chessington United may refer to:
Chessington & Hook United F.C., known as Chessington United between 1972 and 1986
Mole Valley Predators F.C., known as Chessington United between 1998 and 2005